Takeover Target (27 September 1999 – 20 June 2015) was a much-travelled Australian Thoroughbred racehorse who  won top sprinting races in each of the five major cities in Australia as well as in the United Kingdom, Japan, and Singapore.

He was owned and trained by Joe Janiak, a former Queanbeyan, New South Wales, taxi driver, and was ridden by Sydney-based jockey Jay Ford in all but two race starts. He was purchased for A$1,250 plus $125 GST in July 2003 and earned $6,028,311 in prize money.

Racing career
Sired by Celtic Swing out of the unraced dam Shady Stream, Takeover Target was ruled out of racing for thirty months due to leg and joint problems. He did not make his debut until he was a four-year-old. He was unbeaten in all of his starts in 2004 and set a seven-race winning run following his debut on 23 April 2004 in a 1,200 metre maiden race at Queanbeyan Racecourse. These wins included victory in the listed Pacesetter Stakes at Gosford Racecourse, the listed Ramornie Handicap at Grafton Racecourse, and the Group 1 Salinger Stakes at Flemington Racecourse in October of that year.

Takeover Target then endured two injuries which kept him out of racing for a further six months. He pulled up lame after winning a barrier trial at the Gold Coast Racecourse in late November 2004 while being prepared for two stakes races at Doomben Racecourse, then had a piece of infected bone removed from a hoof while being prepared for the Sydney Autumn Racing Carnival in 2005.

In 2005, he failed to win in six starts before a first-up win in December at Doomben Racecourse in the Group 3 Summer Stakes, winning by more than five lengths carrying 59.5 kg while breaking the 1,200 metre track record previously held by Lion Hunter with a time of 1:07.88. He followed this up with another win in the listed Doomben Stakes, winning by three lengths carrying 60.5 kg and running within four one-hundreds of a second of the 1,350-metre track record held by Falvelon.

In the early part of 2006, Takeover Target won two Group 1 races, the Lightning Stakes and the Newmarket Handicap at Flemington Racecourse, becoming only the third horse behind Black Onyx and Shaftesbury Avenue to carry at least 57 kg to victory in the Newmarket Handicap in the last thirty-six years. He also became only the second horse behind Maybe Mahal to win Flemington's three major Group 1 sprints: the Salinger Stakes, Lightning Stakes and Newmarket Handicap. These wins resulted in Takeover Target being invited to compete in the Royal Ascot carnival in June in the United Kingdom.

His British campaign started successfully when he won the Group 2 King's Stand Stakes on 20 June 2006, defeating Benbaun. He then finished third behind Les Arcs in the Group 1 Golden Jubilee Stakes four days later and seventh behind Les Arcs in the Group 1 July Cup at Newmarket Racecourse, beaten two lengths. After his King's Stand Stakes win, Takeover Target was declared the best sprinter in the world on turf by the International Federation of Horseracing Authorities with a rating of 118, which improved to 121 with a win in Japan later in the year.

At the end of the 2005–06 season, Takeover Target was named Australian Champion Sprinter.

From England, he travelled to Japan, where he finished second in the Group 2 Centaur Stakes at Chukyo Racecourse to locally trained mare She Is Tosho. In the Group 1 Sprinters Stakes at Nakayama Racecourse, Takeover Target won by about three lengths, defeating a field which contained Meisho Bowler, Silent Witness, She Is Tosho, Les Arcs, and Benbaun. In Hong Kong, where he was to compete in the Group 1 Hong Kong International Sprint, he was withdrawn by stewards on the morning of the race for returning a positive reading to 17-alpha-hydroxyprogesterone hexanoate, a hormone. The horse was a short-priced favourite and, if he had won the race, his connections stood to collect a further US$1 million bonus in prize money for winning Group 1 races in the Global Sprint Challenge series in three of the four host countries. Instead the horse's owner and trainer, Joe Janiak, was fined 200,000 Hong Kong Dollars by stewards.

On International Day in Hong Kong, Takeover Target was crowned Global Sprint Challenge Champion for 2006, finishing with 53 points, well clear of his closest competitor on 17 points.

His return to racing in Australia in 2007 was delayed, first by an injury sustained in an exhibition gallop at a Queanbeyan race meeting in early March, then by a virus which forced him to miss the Group 1 T J Smith Stakes at Randwick Racecourse in early April. He resumed the following week in the Group 1 All Aged Stakes at Randwick over 1,400 metres, where he ran fifth. Takeover Target then finished second in the Group 1 BTC Cup at Doomben Racecourse followed by a win in the Group 1 Doomben 10,000, defeating the filly Gold Edition. He then headed back to England for the 2007 Royal Ascot carnival.

On 19 June, he finished fourth in the Group 2 King's Stand Stakes behind Miss Andretti before finishing second in the Group 1 Golden Jubilee Stakes to American-bred entrant Soldier's Tale. He then returned to Australia and his new home at Coffs Harbour in New South Wales.

Due to the 2007 Australian equine influenza outbreak that spread throughout New South Wales and Queensland in late August, Takeover Target was not able to travel to Victoria to compete in the Melbourne Spring Racing Carnival. He resumed racing on 1 December 2007 in a $100,000 Open Handicap race at Randwick.  He carried 61 kg to defeat Dance Hero, a former Golden Slipper and multiple Group 1 winner. Three weeks later, Takeover Target raced again at Randwick in a listed race over 1,200 metres in what was dubbed a match race with Dance Hero.  Takeover Target held off the late challenge of Scone mare Alverta to win the race. Dance Hero finished last. In the Group 2 Villiers Stakes over 1,400 metres, Takeover Target held off the challenge of the former North American-trained Group 1 winner Honor In War to win by a nose with Alverta 2½ lengths back in third place, but he lost the race on protest to Honor In War due to interference 200 metres from the finish.

Following a spell, Takeover Target returned to racing on 26 April 2008 in the Group 1 T J Smith Stakes over 1,200 metres at Randwick, finishing third behind multiple Group 1 winner Apache Cat. He then travelled to Singapore, where he won the Singapore Turf Club’s KrisFlyer International Sprint (G1) over 1200 metres at Kranji Racecourse on 18 May 2008 in new track record time of 1:08.80.

From Singapore, Takeover Target travelled to England. On 17 June, he finished second in the Group 1 King's Stand Stakes behind Equiano. Four days later, he finished fourth in the Group 1 Golden Jubilee Stakes behind Kingsgate Native despite suffering suspensory ligament damage during the race.

At the end of the 2007–08 season, Takeover Target was named Australian Champion International Performer for the third consecutive season.

His return to racing in Australia was delayed as a consequence of a stone bruise sustained while being prepared for the Group 1 Patinack Farm Classic at Flemington Racecourse in early November 2008. He resumed three weeks later in the Group 2 Winterbottom Stakes over 1200 metres at Ascot Racecourse in Perth, Western Australia in what was promoted as an eagerly anticipated rematch with the reigning Australian Champion Sprinter Apache Cat. He led all the way and held off a late challenge from Apache Cat to win by a nose. Two weeks later, Takeover Target contested the Group 3 A J Scahill Stakes over 1400 metres at Ascot Racecourse, defeating last season's race winner, Tarzi, by almost three lengths.

His next campaign began at Royal Randwick on 18 April 2009 in the Group 1 T J Smith Stakes over 1,200 metres against five other Group One winners, including last year's victor, Apache Cat. Nash Rawiller was declared the rider as Joe Janiak stated he didn't want the horse carrying too much 'dead weight' as regular rider Jay Ford was due to ride on the same card with a light weight so would have to carry extra weight on Takeover Target. He went out third favourite behind Apache Cat and after jumping well crossed to the lead. He kicked away in the straight and won by two and three quarter lengths from 3yo Northern Meteor with three lengths to Apache Cat in third in race record time. He was given a warm reception by the crowd returning to scale. Two weeks later, Takeover Target contested The Goodwood (G1) over 1,200 metres at Morphettville Racecourse in Adelaide, South Australia, where he defeated I Am Invincible by one length. He then travelled to Singapore, where he ran eighth in the Group 1 KrisFlyer International Sprint over 1,200 metres at Kranji Racecourse on 17 May 2009.

From Singapore, Takeover Target travelled to England, where he was to contest the Group 1 Golden Jubilee Stakes on 20 June at Royal Ascot, only to be withdrawn on race eve due to an elevated temperature. Three weeks later, he contested the Group 1 July Cup at Newmarket Racecourse, finishing in seventh behind Fleeting Spirit. He sustained a career-ending injury when he cracked the cannon bone in his near hind leg. After he underwent surgery at the Newmarket Equine Veterinary Hospital to insert five screws in the cannon bone, Janiak officially announced his retirement.

In a career that spanned six seasons, Takeover Target won twenty-one of his forty-one starts, including eight races at Group One level, and accumulated $6,028,311 in prize money, which placed him in sixth position amongst the Millionaire racehorses trained in Australia and the only specialist sprinter in the top twenty at the time of his retirement.
 
A book titled TAKEOVER TARGET - THE BEST $1375 JOE JANIAK EVER SPENT was released after his retirement in 2009.

In September 2010, Janiak announced that Takeover Target might race again as he was fully recovered from the leg injury that forced his retirement and was as keen as ever to continue racing. In October 2010, Janiak said that the horse would not make a comeback.

Takeover Target was inducted into the Australian Racing Hall of Fame in 2012. The horse, known as Archie, was retired to "Toofrook" in Lawrence, Northern Rivers, NSW. He was euthanised after suffering a serious leg injury in his paddock on 20 June 2015.

Race record

Pedigree

References

 "Target a horse for the ages" The Age (Melbourne) article, 6 May 2008
 Takeover Target's pedigree and racing stats
 

1999 racehorse births
2015 racehorse deaths
Thoroughbred family 11-d
Racehorses bred in Australia
Racehorses trained in Australia
Australian Racing Hall of Fame horses